Lowther Castle Stead is a medieval site in Cumbria, possibly a ringwork castle. Lancaster University Archaeology Unit carried out a survey of the earthworks in 1997.

References

External links 

 Bibliography of sources on the Gatehouse Gazetteer

Castles in Cumbria
Penrith, Cumbria